Andrew Windsor may refer to:

Andrew Windsor, 1st Baron Windsor, (1467–1543), English nobleman
Prince Andrew, Duke of York (born 1960), son of Elizabeth II, of the House of Windsor
Andrew Windsor, 7th Earl of Plymouth, heir of Other Windsor, 6th Earl of Plymouth

See also
Andrews Windsor, MP